Benthesikyme or Benthesicyme (Ancient Greek: Βενθεσικύμη means "wave of the deep" from βένθος "depth (i.e. sea)" and κῦμα "wave") in Greek mythology, according to the Bibliotheca,  was a daughter of Poseidon and Amphitrite and wife of Enalos, by whom she had two daughters. She raised Eumolpus, son of Chione and Poseidon.

Mythology 
When Chione gave birth, she was so frightened of her father's reaction that she threw the baby into the ocean. As Pseudo-Apollodorus relates:

But Poseidon picked him up and conveyed him to Ethiopia, and gave him to Benthesikyme (a daughter of his own by Amphitrite) to bring up. When she was full grown, Benthesicyme's husband gave him one of his two daughters. But he tried to force his wife's sister... 
Some Greeks claim that Benthesikyme had a son named Aprhonysis, but such claims can't be verified.

Accordingly, Eumolpus was sent into exile.

Notes

References 

 Apollodorus, The Library with an English Translation by Sir James George Frazer, F.B.A., F.R.S. in 2 Volumes, Cambridge, MA, Harvard University Press; London, William Heinemann Ltd. 1921. . Online version at the Perseus Digital Library. Greek text available from the same webs
Hard, Robin, The Routledge Handbook of Greek Mythology: Based on H.J. Rose's "Handbook of Greek Mythology", Psychology Press, 2004, . Google Books.

Greek goddesses
Children of Poseidon